The 47th Walker Cup Match was played 7 and 8 September 2019 at Royal Liverpool Golf Club, Hoylake, Merseyside, England. Royal Liverpool hosted the 1983 Walker Cup. The United States won by 15½ points to 10½. They trailed 7½ to 8½ coming in to the final day singles but won 8 of the 10 matches to win convincingly.

Format
On Saturday, there were four matches of foursomes in the morning and eight singles matches in the afternoon. On Sunday, there were four matches of foursomes in the morning, followed by ten singles matches (involving every player) in the afternoon. In all, 26 matches were played.

Each of the 26 matches was worth one point in the larger team competition. If a match was all square after the 18th hole extra holes were not played. Rather, each side earned ½ a point toward their team total. The team that accumulated at least 13½ points won the competition. In the event of a tie, the previous winner would retain the Cup.

Teams
Ten players for the United States and Great Britain & Ireland played in the event with each team having a non-playing captain. The two teams were announced following the U.S. Amateur.

Craig Watson was the captain of the Great Britain & Ireland team, while Nathaniel Crosby captained the United States team.

Note: "Rank" is the World Amateur Golf Ranking.

U.S. team
The first three members of the team were selected in July 2019 as the leading three Americans in the World Amateur Golf Ranking. They were Texas sophomore Cole Hammer, high school senior Akshay Bhatia and mid-amateur Stewart Hagestad. The final members of the team were announced on 18 August 2019. With his victory in the U.S. Amateur at Pinehurst Resort, Georgia Tech senior Andy Ogletree earned an automatic place in the team. John Augenstein, who lost to Ogletree in the U.S. Amateur final was also chosen. Also selected were one current college golfer, John Pak of Florida State, and four recent graduates: Steven Fisk (Georgia Southern), Alex Smalley (Duke), Isaiah Salinda (Stanford), and Brandon Wu (Stanford). The USGA named two alternates for the team: Chandler Phillips and Ricky Castillo.

Note: "Rank" is the World Amateur Golf Ranking.

Saturday's matches

Morning foursomes

Afternoon singles

Sunday's matches

Morning foursomes

Afternoon singles

References

External links

R&A site 
Royal Liverpool Golf Club coverage
Golf Bible Walker Cup coverage

Walker Cup
Golf tournaments in England
Sport in the Metropolitan Borough of Wirral
Walker Cup
Walker Cup
Walker Cup